Ivan Anton Vasilj (born 5 April 1991) is a Croatian football player, currently playing for Zadar.

Club career
Vasilj passed through all the ranks of the NK Zadar academy. A captain of their U-19 team at the time, he made his professional debut in the Prva HNL at 6 March 2010 against NK Karlovac.

A left-footed left back/winger, he went on to establish himself in the NK Zadar first team, featuring regularly in the second part of the 2010–11 season onwards. In December 2012, the doping test after a match revealed the presence of the illegal cannabinoid JWH-018 in his body. It was, however, ascertained, that it wasn't taken directly and willingly, possibly inhaled unwittingly somewhere in form of incense or air freshener, and therefore not punished harshly and he only ended up missing one match because of it. He would go on to feature regularly for the rest of the season.

In January 2014 he terminated his contract with NK Zadar. In February, he joined Hajduk Split on a free transfer. He's a left back.

Personal life
Though born and raised in Zadar, his family originally came from Međugorje

References

External links
 
Ivan Anton Vasilj at hajduk.hr
 http://hajduk.hr/vijest/ivan-anton-vasilj-novi-je-igrac-hajduka/4360

1991 births
Living people
Sportspeople from Zadar
Association football fullbacks
Croatian footballers
NK Zadar players
HNK Hajduk Split players
NK Slaven Belupo players
RNK Split players
GNK Dinamo Zagreb II players
NK Brežice 1919 players
Croatian Football League players
First Football League (Croatia) players
Second Football League (Croatia) players
Slovenian Second League players
Croatian expatriate footballers
Expatriate footballers in Slovenia
Croatian expatriate sportspeople in Slovenia